St-Viateur Bagel is a famous Montreal-style bagel bakery located in the neighbourhood of Mile End in the borough of Le Plateau-Mont-Royal, Montreal, Quebec, Canada.

History

St-Viateur Bagel was established on May 21, 1957 by Myer Lewkowicz, a Holocaust survivor who moved to Canada in 1953. Lewkowicz had grown up poor in a shtetl near Kraków, Poland. Lewkowicz spoke of his experience in the Holocaust influencing the opening the shop by stating "At Buchenwald, all I dreamt of was a piece of bread". He learned the trade as an employee of Montreal Bagel Bakery, another local bagel shop owned by Hyman Seligman. The shop is named after the street it is located on, St-Viateur Street, and is one of the longest-running bagel shops in Montreal. In 1985 St-Viateur Bagel suffered an extensive fire, but the wood stove remained entirely intact.

St-Viateur Bagel has two bakeries, three bagel cafés, a food truck, and an online store, in addition to the original storefront. In March 2019, the shop's Monkland Avenue café permanently closed due to the end of their 18-year lease and rising rent prices. Today, the bakery is owned by Joe Morena, who had previously worked at the shop for 15 years, and competes with the nearby Fairmount Bagel for the title of Montreal's best bagel.

In 2017, St-Viateur Bagel celebrated its 60th anniversary.

Cultural significance 

St-Viateur Bagel Shop lies on the border of the Jewish Quarter and the Mile End neighbourhood. In addition to St-Viateur Bagel Shop, Montreal's Jewish Quarter is also the home of Schwartz's deli, Moishes Steakhouse, Cheskie's Bakery, and Beauty's Luncheonette, all of which have a long history within the Jewish community in Montreal. A study done by the Université de Montréal explains that the large influence of Jewish food in Montreal culinary culture is likely because of how inexpensive and widely-accessible items such as bagels and smoked meat were in Montreal in the early 20th century. This is due to the fact that there was a large Jewish immigrant population which put down roots along Boulevard St. Laurent. Professor of Theology Oliver Bauer of the Université de Montréal explains in the study that the roundness of a bagel represents infinity and immortality. It is because of this representation that bagels are often served at a bris ceremonies—the celebration of a baby boy's circumcision—and at shiva gatherings—mourning period after a death has occurred.

Bagel-making process 

Since the shop opened in 1957, their process of producing bagels has stayed true to the original recipe. According to owner Joe Morena, each bagel is hand rolled individually, boiled in honey water for 30–60 seconds, dipped in seeds, and finally baked on a long wooden plank in a wood-burning oven. In contrast to the New York-style bagel which contains similar ingredients, the Montreal bagel differs in size, taste, and style: the Montreal bagel tends to be sweeter, thinner, and has a larger hole. The authentic wood-burning oven creates the crispy outer texture characteristic of a Montreal bagel.

Bagels
St-Viateur sells several varieties of Montreal-style bagels including: plain, sesame, poppy, all dressed, whole wheat, cinnamon & raisin, rosemary & sea salt, blueberry, pumpernickel and muesli. Their website provides nutritional information on each bagel including ingredients and allergens. Each bagel ranges between 200 and 240 calories per 2 servings (1 serving is listed as half of a bagel). An order of two dozen bagels is priced between $22 and $25CAD.

Services
In addition to in-store and delivery service, St-Viateur offers a catering service with 24 hours' notice. The catering menu includes various options such as smoked salmon platters, cheese platters, and salads. Additionally, a St-Viateur food truck operates exclusively throughout the spring into the fall, and is available to book for private and corporate events. The shop also offers branded merchandise including T-shirts, tote bags, aprons, pins, key chains, and bread knives. The merchandise is emblazoned with their signature bagel logo. St-Viateur ships bagels nationwide and to the United States.

In the media

The closing of the Monkland Village location of St-Viateur in March 2019 was widely reported across Montreal and National news outlets.

In 2018, the Globe and Mail published an article detailing how wood-burning businesses that are unable to meet emission bylaw requirements will be forced to switch to gas or electric. The article cited St-Viateur among other traditional bagels shops which would be directly impacted by this development. St-Viateur Bagel has since installed a filter to reduce emissions and comply with updated local emissions bylaws.

In 2020, St-Viateur Bagel is featured in an episode, season 3 episode 5, of the Netflix show Somebody Feed Phil.

See also

Historic Jewish Quarter, Montreal
Monkland Avenue, location of a branch store
Schwartz's
Wilensky's
Fairmount Bagel

References

External links
St-Viateur Bagel

1957 establishments in Quebec
Ashkenazi Jewish culture in Montreal
Bagel companies
Montreal cuisine
History of Montreal
Landmarks in Montreal
Bakeries of Canada
Jewish Canadian history
Jews and Judaism in Montreal
Le Plateau-Mont-Royal
Polish-Jewish culture in Canada
Shops in Montreal